Limón Fútbol Club, commonly known as Limón,  was a professional football club based in Limón Province, Costa Rica. It last played in the Liga FPD.

The team played their home matches at the Estadio Juan Gobán, although the more recent Estadio Nuevo de Limón serves as an alternative ground.

History
In 2009, local businessman Carlos Howden Pascal decided to invest in local second division soccer team A.D. Limonense, shareholders agreed to lease the team and were renamed "Limón FC". In 2010, the team quickly returned to Costa Rica top level division Primera Division.

By June 2011, Carlos Pascal was incarcerated and had his banks accounts frozen. In doing, he compromised the team's financial situation.  

In 2013, he was released but his bank accounts were still frozen, Currently some players are receiving bonds as salary until the case is settled. Many players don't only play for Limón for income. Most of them work at the local port and various associated businesses.

Limon FC were dissolved in February 2022 because of debts to the CCSS.

Stadium

The Juan Gobán Stadium is a soccer stadium located in Limón, head of the province of the same name, on the Caribbean coast of Costa Rica.

In February 2010, a synthetic turf measuring 91 meters long by 72 meters wide was installed. The following reforms included the construction of boxes, press areas, complete remodeling of the dressing rooms and installation of artificial lighting.

In September 2010, the Juan Gobán stadium was reopened after a series of renovations that involved a year and a half of work, in addition to an investment of close to $1 million, 800 thousand dollars.

Among the novelties was the expansion of the dressing room area from two to four, a weight room, a doping room, laundry, four sodas, two offices, the installation of 20 restrooms and a VIP area for 220 people. In addition, there was a total replacement for the roof of the shadow grandstand. Also, the capacity of the stadium was expanded to 2,349 people.  The stadium was home to the Limon F.C. of the First Division of Costa Rica from 2010 to 2020.

Honours
 2009–10: Segunda Division Champions
 2012–13: Invierno Semi-finals

See also
A.D. Limonense
Limón Black Star

References

External links
 Facebook Page

2009 establishments in Costa Rica
2022 disestablishments in Costa Rica
Defunct football clubs in Costa Rica
association football clubs established in 2009
Association football clubs disestablished in 2022